Olenins' House is a building of the historical significance in Pushkin, Saint Petersburg. It was built in the period of 1828. Nowadays it is an object of cultural heritage. The building is located on 1/17 Pushkinskaya Street.

History 
The house was built in 1828 by architect VM Gornostaev for the court stoker Agafonov. Since 1831 the house belongs to the family of Olenins. In their house in Tsarskoe Selo there was AS Pushkin. In 1845, on behalf of the widow of the actual State Councilor VA Olenina, architect N. Nikitin built a wooden top with a mezzanine. In 1907, the sanatorium of the Holy Trinity Community of Sisters of Mercy was placed in the house. When the building was converted by engineer Lundberg, the mezzanine was rebuilt into a tower with a dome. With the outbreak of the First World War, the community also equipped a small infirmary there, with 15 soldiers. After the October Revolution, the sanatorium was also housed in the house. In 1921 Anna Akhmatova lived there. It was in this sanatorium that she learned about the death of her first husband, Nikolai Gumilev, and his brother, Andrei Gorenko.

Architecture 
The house is two-story, it faces the two streets. The corner of the house is rounded, crowned by a dome with a tower. On the tower in 1999 was placed a weather vane in the form of a rooster, symbolizing the golden cockerel from Pushkin's fairy tale, to the anniversary of which he was presented to the city.

References

Literature

Sources 
 
 

Buildings and structures in Pushkin
Houses completed in 1828
1828 establishments in the Russian Empire
Cultural heritage monuments in Saint Petersburg